Ilet a Brouee is a Caribbean island and forms part of Haiti. It lies in the Canal de L'est strait and it is located north of the Île-à-Vache island. Ilet a Brouee is one of the most densely populated islands in the world, with up to 500 people sharing an area of just .

See also
List of islands of Haiti

References 

Ilet a Brouee